Kyabobo National Park (pronounced CHAY-a-bobo) is a  national park in Ghana.

Kyabobo is located in the Oti Region on the border with Togo. The nearest town is Nkwanta.

The reserve was established in 1993 but its boundaries were adjusted several times until September 1999 when the current and final boundary was fixed. Ghana's second highest mountain, Mount Dzebobo is contained within the park and offers visitors an impressive view of the Lake Volta.

The park is located in a transition zone between tropical rain forest and tree savanna. The Park's wildlife includes African bush elephants, African leopards, African buffalo, waterbuck, several primate species, bushbuck, duikers and, a symbol for the park, the rock hyrax. A park survey lists at least 500 species of butterflies and 235 birds.

The park has seven hiking trails and two mountain biking trails. The most popular hiking trail follows a ridge in the southeast corner of the park to a peak atop one of the "Breast Mountains."

References

National parks of Ghana
Protected areas established in 1993
1993 establishments in Ghana
Oti Region